Punicic acid (also called trichosanic acid) is a polyunsaturated fatty acid, 18:3 cis-9, trans-11, cis-13. It is named for the pomegranate, (Punica granatum), and is obtained from pomegranate seed oil. 
It has also been found in the seed oils of snake gourd.

Punicic acid is a conjugated linolenic acid or CLnA; i.e. it has three conjugated double bonds. It is chemically similar to the conjugated linoleic acids, or CLA, which have two. It has also been classified as an "n-5" or "omega-5" polyunsaturated fatty acid. In lab rats, punicic acid was converted to the CLA rumenic acid (9Z11E-CLA). In vitro, it shows anti-invasive activity against prostate cancer cells. OLETF rats—a strain which becomes obese—remained relatively lean when punicic acid was added to their feed.

See also
 Polyunsaturated fatty acids—conjugated fatty acids

References

Fatty acids
Alkenoic acids
Polyenes